The Three Handed Mother of God Church is the name given to a religious building that is affiliated to the Ukrainian Greek Catholic Church (one of the Eastern Catholic Church in full communion with the Pope in Rome) that is located in the 22 street Laboratooriumi in Tallinn, Estonia. The Evangelical Lutheran Church of Estonia managed the building in the period between 1994 and 1997.

In late 1997, the church was destroyed by fire, with arson that ended a criminal trial. On 14 October 2000, the church was restored and consecrated in honor of the Virgin Mary. The ceremony was celebrated by Archbishop Ljubomõr Guzar of the Ukrainian Greek Catholic Church, the church has paintings by the artist Lviv Petro Gumenjuk, and the interior was designed and built by one of his assistants Anatoly Ljutjuk. All Masses are celebrated in Ukrainian language.

See also
Catholicism in Estonia
Ukrainian Greek Catholic Church

References

Catholic Church in Estonia
Churches in Tallinn
Tallinn